Top Country Albums is a chart that ranks the top-performing country music albums in the United States, published by Billboard.  In 1999, eight different albums topped the chart, based on electronic point of sale data provided by SoundScan Inc.

In the issue of Billboard dated January 2, Garth Brooks occupied the top spot with the live recording Double Live, the album's fifth week at number one.  Having been certified more than 20 times platinum by the Recording Industry Association of America, Double Live is the biggest-selling live album of all time in the United States.  Later in the year, Brooks returned to the top of the chart when he spent a single week at number one with the seasonal album Garth Brooks & the Magic of Christmas.  It was the singer's eighth consecutive number one and his tenth chart-topping album of the 1990s, a decade in which he experienced a level of mainstream popularity and success unprecedented for a country artist.  Another country singer who became a global superstar during this era was Canadian vocalist Shania Twain, whose album Come On Over spent 26 weeks at number one during 1999, including a spell of 15 consecutive weeks in the top spot, the longest such run of the year.  The album would ultimately spend a total of 50 weeks at number one, making it the longest-running chart-topper in the history of the Top Country Albums listing.  In 2000, it was recognized by the Recording Industry Association of America as the highest-selling album of all time by a female artist, as well as the biggest-selling country album.

Garth Brooks was one of two acts with two number ones in 1999, the other being the all-female trio the Dixie Chicks.  The group's first album to enter the Top Country Albums listing, Wide Open Spaces, finally reached the top spot in its 51st week on the chart, and remained there for seven weeks.  The group returned to the top spot in September with Fly, which spent eight weeks at number one.  Both albums won the Grammy Award for Best Country Album, at the 1999 and 2000 ceremonies respectively.  As well as the Dixie Chicks, Faith Hill topped the chart for the first time in 1999 with her album Breathe, which reached the peak position in the issue of Billboard dated November 27.  It would go on to win the Grammy Award for Best Country Album at the 2001 ceremony.  Hill's first appearance atop the listing came six months after her husband, Tim McGraw, achieved his fourth consecutive number one with A Place in the Sun.

Chart history

References

1999
1999 record charts